Pradikta Wicaksono (born January 10, 1986) known as Dikta, is an Indonesian singer. He sings for Yovie & Nuno along with Dudi Oris. He joined Yovie & Nuno in 2007. He is known for songs like "The Special One" and "Still the One." His solo efforts are known as Dikta Project, and he also plays guitar for The Greytown Brothers, fronted by Jakarta-based bluesman Kongko Cadillac.

Biography

Personal life 
Pradikta Wicaksono was born in Jakarta, Indonesia, on January 10, 1986. He was the second child of five siblings.

Discography

As member Yovie and Nuno

As member Dikta Project

Albums 
 The Special One (2007)
 Winning Eleven (2010)
 Still The One (2015)

Singles 
 Galau (2012)

Filmography

References

External links 
 Yovie & Nuno official site

See also 
 Kahitna
 Yovie & Nuno

1986 births
Living people
Indonesian pop singers
21st-century Indonesian male singers
Singers from Jakarta